Kornélia Pap (later Méray, born 21 July 1930) is a Hungarian retired rower and journalist. She is the country's most successful rower.

Pap took up rowing in 1950. Her first international success was a bronze medal at the 1955 European Rowing Championships in Bucharest in single sculls. She won further bronze medals in 1956 in Bled and in 1957 in Duisburg. From 1958 in Poznań to 1961 in Prague, she was European champion four years in a row. She was elected Sportswoman of the Year in Hungary three years in a row from 1959 to 1961, after having come second in 1958. She worked as a journalist for Új Sport from 1960 to 1985.

References

External links
 

1930 births
Living people
Hungarian female rowers
European Rowing Championships medalists
20th-century Hungarian women
21st-century Hungarian women